Acanthodactylus scutellatus, also known commonly as the Nidua fringe-fingered lizard or the Nidua fringe-toed lizard, is a species of lizard in the family Lacertidae. The species is endemic to northern Africa and the Middle East.

Geographic range
A. scutellatus is found in Algeria, Chad, Egypt, Iraq, Israel, Jordan, Kuwait, Libya, Mali, Mauritania, Niger, Saudi Arabia, Sudan, and Tunisia.

Reproduction
A. scutellatus is oviparous.

References

Further reading
Trape, Jean-François; Trape, Sébastien; Chirio, Laurent (2012). Lézards, crocodiles et tortues d'Afrique occidentale et du Sahara. Paris: IRD Orstom. 503 pp. . (in French).

Acanthodactylus
Reptiles of the Arabian Peninsula
Reptiles of the Middle East
Reptiles of North Africa
Reptiles of West Africa
Reptiles of Iraq
Reptiles of Jordan
Reptiles described in 1827
Taxa named by Jean Victoire Audouin